Nastanthus falklandicus, also called false-plantain, is a species of plant in the Calyceraceae family. It is endemic to Falkland Islands. Its natural habitat is rocky shores.

References

Calyceraceae
Flora of the Falkland Islands
Vulnerable plants
Taxonomy articles created by Polbot